The Atlantic Coast Line Railroad's Haines City Branch was a railroad line running from their main line in Haines City, Florida south through southern Central Florida.  The line notably ran through Lake Wales, Avon Park, Sebring, and Immokalee and would stretch as far south as Everglades City upon its completion in 1928. Everglades City would be the southernmost point the entire Atlantic Coast Line Railroad system would ever reach.  The Haines City Branch was one of the Atlantic Coast Line's major additions to its Florida network, much of which was previously part of the Plant System.

History
The Atlantic Coast Line Railroad began construction on the Haines City Branch in 1910, with its initial route running from the main line in Haines City south 47 miles to Sebring.  This segment would be complete in June 1912 and served many vegetable and citrus growers.

In 1916, the Atlantic Coast Line made plans to extend the branch further south to Immokalee.  Construction began that year with track reaching the Caloosahatchee River at Ortona by April 1918.  This project also included a branch from Harrisburg, just south of Palmdale, to Moore Haven which was completed around the same time.  Harrisburg was named after the Harris track-laying machine used to construct the line.  The Atlantic Coast Line Railroad would then charter the Moore Haven & Clewiston Railway to extend the Moore Haven Branch southeast a short distance to Clewiston, which would be complete in 1921.  The Southern Sugar Corporation (which became the U.S. Sugar Corporation in 1931) would be a major customer on the line in Clewiston and they would also build private branch tracks from the line to their sugar fields.

The Atlantic Coast Line would extended the line one last time in 1929 to the Miami Canal in Lake Harbor to connect with the Florida East Coast Railway's Kissimmee Valley Line.  A spur south and east to Okeelanta would also be built.

In 1919, construction resumed on the main route from Ortona south.  Track was built from Ortona south across the Caloosahatchee River through Goodno, Sears, and Felda to Immokalee.  The first train to Immokalee arrived on October 16, 1921.  In later years, the line from Harrisburg to Immokalee was known as the Immokalee Branch on employee timetables.

Shortly after service to Immokalee began, the Atlantic Coast Line's President Henry Walters authorized one last extension of the line south to Everglades City.  The Atlantic Coast Line accomplished this extension by purchasing the Deep Lake Railroad from entrepreneur Barron Collier, the namesake of Collier County.  The Deep Lake Railroad was originally built in 1913 by Walter Langford and John Roach, who operated a grapefruit grove near Deep Lake.  The line was used to transport grapefruit south to Everglades City to be sold and shipped.  In 1921, Collier purchased the line and grapefruit groves and also used the line to transport pine and cypress logs to a sawmill he operated in Everglades City.  After the Atlantic Coast Line acquired the Deep Lake Railroad, they rebuilt it to their standards and extended track south from Immokalee to Deep Lake.  The line was completed in 1928 and a passenger depot was built in Everglades City (known then as simply Everglades), which would be the farthest south the Atlantic Coast Line would ever reach.

In 1925, the Atlantic Coast Line would lose its monopoly in communities on the northern half of the Haines City Branch when the Atlantic Coast Line's competitor, the Seaboard Air Line Railroad, built the Florida Western and Northern Railroad through Auburndale, West Lake Wales, Avon Park, and Sebring.  The Seaboard line paralleled the Haines City Branch to the west through much of southern Central Florida, and the lines crossed each other just south of Avon Park.  

By 1949, the line was relatively busy with the Atlantic Coast Line running a daily local passenger train from Haines City to Clewiston.  A daily local freight train also ran from Haines City to Lake Harbor, and two additional freight trains ran six days a week from Haines City to Sebring.  In addition, a mixed train (both passengers and freight) ran six days a week from Palmdale to Immokalee and Everglades City.  In 1958, service to Everglades City was discontinued due to diminished traffic and track was removed between there and Copeland.  By 1961, track was removed between Copeland and Sunniland.

The Atlantic Coast Line and Seaboard Air Line Railroads would merge in 1967, with the merged company being named the Seaboard Coast Line Railroad.  The Seaboard Coast Line ended up using the former Seaboard Air Line track in the combined network as the main route through the area.  The Haines City Branch would then be broken up into smaller branches of the Seaboard line.  Track was removed between Waverly and Lake Wales, between Frostproof and Avon Park (with a short piece of the line remaining as a spur), and between the Avon Park spur and Sebring (which eliminated the crossing of the two lines).  The Seaboard Coast Line would then operate the north end of the line as their Haines City Subdivision from Haines City to Waverly.  Track from Lake Wales to Frostproof became part of the Lake Wales Subdivision.  Remaining track south of Sebring to Lake Harbor became the Sebring Subdivision, and track from Harrisburg to Immokalee became the Immokalee Subdivision.
 
In 1980, the Seaboard Coast Line's parent company merged with the Chessie System, creating the CSX Corporation.  The CSX Corporation initially operated the Chessie and Seaboard Systems separately until 1986, when they were merged into CSX Transportation.  By 1982, the company removed track from south of Haines City to Waverly, as well as track from Immokalee to Sunniland.  The rest of the Immokalee Subdivision was abandoned in 1989.

Current conditions

Despite parts of the Haines City Branch being abandoned, some segments remain in service.  At the north end, the line remains within Haines City but is now serves as an industrial spur off of CSX's A Line (the former Atlantic Coast Line main line).  The line remains grade separated through downtown Haines City, owing to how busy the line was in its earlier days.

From Lake Wales to Frostproof, the line is still in service and is now operated by the Florida Midland Railroad, a shortline that took over the line in 1987.  This segment is now connected to the Auburndale Subdivision via a former Seaboard Air Line track from West Lake Wales to Lake Wales.

The short industrial spur in Avon Park is still in service that now branches off the Auburndale Subdivision (former Seaboard line).

The remaining track from Sebring to Clewiston and Lake Harbor also remains in service.  U.S. Sugar, who has historically been a major customer on that part line for its entire history, bought it in 1994 and established its own shortline, the South Central Florida Express, Inc., who continues to operate it today.

State Road 29 continues to run very close to the former right of way between Immokalee and Everglades City.

Historic stations

Haines City to Everglades

Harrisburg to Lake Harbor

References

Rail infrastructure in Florida
Defunct Florida railroads
Atlantic Coast Line Railroad